Nam Hyun-Seong (born 6 May 1985) is a South Korean football midfielder.

Club career
Nam joined Daegu FC from his youth club Sungkyunkwan University as a draftee for the 2008 season, and would make just four appearances in the senior side that season.  He gained more matchplay in the 2009 season, playing in eight K-League matches up until the mid-season break.  On 1 July 2009, Nam transferred to Czech Republic club FC Banik Ostrava, who play in the Gambrinus liga, the Czech Republic's premier league.

Nam made his first start for his new club on 8 August 2009, coming on as a 90th-minute substitute in a match against Viktoria Plzen.  However, this proved to be his only match in his one-year stint with FC Banik.  During the 2010 K-League mid-season break, Nam returned to Daegu FC.

Club career statistics

References

External links 

1985 births
Living people
Association football midfielders
South Korean footballers
Daegu FC players
K League 1 players
FC Baník Ostrava players